"Better People" is a song written and performed by Australian roots artist Xavier Rudd, released in 2007.  It reached number 56 in the Triple J Hottest 100, 2007.

References

2007 singles
Xavier Rudd songs
2007 songs